Ebn-e Sina  Metro Station is a station of Tehran Metro Line 4. Originally named "Sheykh-o-raeis Metro Station" it was renamed in 2016. It is located in Piruzi street before Chaharsad dastgah.

References 

Tehran Metro stations